This is a list of the players who played, at least once, team for Russia national football team at major level. Those players have to be born abroad or naturalized.

List of players 
Players in bold are currently playing for Russia. The list is updated as 10 October 2019

Azerbaijan

Soviet Union 
 Vladislav Lemish 1992

Belarus

Soviet Union 
 Sergei Gorlukovich 1993–96

Brazil 
Ari 2018–
Mário Fernandes 2017–
 Guilherme 2016–

Estonia

Soviet Union 
 Valeri Karpin 1992–2003

Georgia

Soviet Union 
 Bakhva Tedeyev 1993–94
 Omari Tetradze 1992–2002
 Akhrik Tsveiba 1997

Kazakhstan

Soviet Union 
 Vladimir Niederhaus 1994

Kyrgyzstan 

 Ilzat Akhmetov 2019–

Latvia

Soviet Union 
 Anton Zabolotny 2017–

Tajikistan

Soviet Union 
 Sergei Mandreko 1994
 Mukhsin Mukhamadiev 1995
 Rashid Rakhimov 1994–95

Turkmenistan

Soviet Union 
 Rolan Gusev 2000–05

Ukraine

Russian Empire 
 Grigori Bogemsky 1913

Soviet Union 
 Evgeni Aldonin 2002–07
 Artyom Bezrodny 1999
 Viktor Budyanskiy 2007
 Igor Dobrovolski 1992–98
 Oleksandr Horshkov 1998
 Andrei Kanchelskis 1992–98
 Andrei Karyaka 2001–05
 Vladimir Lebed 1995
 Roman Neustädter 2016–
 Yuriy Nikiforov 1993–2002
 Gennadiy Nizhegorodov 2000–03
 Viktor Onopko 1992–2004
 Sergei Podpaly 1992–94
 Sergei Semak 1997–2010
 Vladislav Ternavsky 1994–96
 Ilya Tsymbalar 1994–99
 Sergei Yuran 1992–99

Born after 1991 Independence 
 Anton Shvets 2018–

Uzbekistan

Soviet Union 
 Valery Kechinov 1994–98
 Andrey Pyatnitsky 1993–95

List by country of birth

Notes 

 
Russia
Association football player non-biographical articles
Russia
Immigration to Russia
Post-Soviet states